Charlie Setford (born 11 May 2004) is a professional footballer who plays for Jong Ajax as a goalkeeper. Born in the Netherlands, he represents England at youth level.

Career
Setford was scouted by AFC Ajax at age 7, and he has been part of the club ever since. He featured regularly at every level of the club's youth system. He signed a three-year contract with Ajax in June 2020. On 2 April 2021, aged 16, Setford made the bench for Jong Ajax in a league match for the first time. He made the bench on three more occasions before the end of the season.

Setford made his first appearance and start for Jong Ajax during the 2021–22 season in a league match on 20 August 2021 against FC Den Bosch. Aged only 17, this made him the youngest goalkeeper ever to play for Ajax. Jong Ajax won 3–2 and Setford made an important one-on-one save. Setford made a second start against MVV on 27 September, saving a penalty in a 3–1 win.

Setford also made the bench for the senior Ajax team for the league match against PEC Zwolle on 11 September 2021, and from then on has made regular appearances on the bench for the seniors, including in the UEFA Champions League match against Besiktas on 28 September.

International career
Setford was born in the Netherlands to an English father and Dutch mother, and is eligible to play for both England and the Netherlands at international level. He has played for both nations at youth level, playing a combined four appearances for Netherlands U15 and Netherlands U16 before 2020, as well as making five appearances for the England U16 team. However, Setford later announced that he had decided to commit to playing for England over the Netherlands at international level, explaining: "It was my own choice, and my family as well. My heart lays at England. At England, they've got more trust in me than they would at Holland, for my feeling. So that's one of the biggest reasons why I chose for England."

On 27 August 2021, Setford received his first call up to the England U18s. He made his first appearance on 3 September 2021, starting a 1–1 draw against Wales U18. On 18 March 2022, he received his first call up the England U20 squad.

Setford is considered one of the most exciting England prospects of his generation.

Personal life
Charlie has a younger brother, Tommy Setford, who also plays for the Ajax youth teams as a goalkeeper and the England U16s. Charlie and Tommy's father is English pro golfer Chris Setford, who has been living in the Netherlands due to his career.

Setford's favourite team other than Ajax is Southampton, as his English father is from Alton near the city. Setford says he and his family only speak English at home.

Honours
Individual
 Ajax Talent of the Future (Abdelhak Nouri Trophy): 2021–22

References

External links
 

2004 births
Living people
Footballers from Haarlem
English footballers
England youth international footballers
Dutch footballers
Netherlands youth international footballers
English people of Dutch descent
Dutch people of English descent
Association football goalkeepers
Jong Ajax players
AFC Ajax players
Eerste Divisie players